On Leopard Rock is a 2018 memoir by Wilbur Smith. It was his first long non-fiction work.

References

External links
Review at Publishers Weekly
On Leopard Rock at Wilbur Smith Books
Review at Kirkus

 
2018 non-fiction books